The RD-107 and its sibling, the RD-108, are a type of rocket engine initially used to launch R-7 Semyorka missiles. RD-107 engines were later used on space launch vehicles based on the R-7. , very similar RD-107A and RD-108A engines are used to launch the Soyuz-2.1a, and Soyuz-2.1b, which are in active service.

Design 

The RD-107 was designed under the direction of Valentin Glushko at the Experimental Design Bureau (OKB-456) between 1954 and 1957. It uses liquid oxygen and kerosene as propellants operating in a gas generator cycle. As was typical by all the descendants of the V-2 rocket technology, the turbine is driven by steam generated by catalytic decomposition of H₂O₂. The steam generator uses solid F-30-P-G catalyst. These are based on a variable sized pellet covered in an aqueous solution of potassium permanganate and sodium. Each engine uses four fixed main combustion chambers. The RD-107 has an additional two vernier combustion chambers that can thrust vector in a single plane to supply attitude control. The RD-108 has four of such vernier combustion chambers to supply full vector control to the Blok-A stage. The single-axle turbopump unit includes the steam driven turbine, an oxidizer pump, a fuel pump, and a nitrogen gas generator for tank pressurization.

The RD-107 engines are used in each of the boosters of the Soyuz-2 rocket, and a single RD-108 is used in the Blok-A stage (the central 1st stage).

One important innovation of this engine was the capability to use variable mixture ratio between fuel and oxidizer. The natural variations in manufacturing between each engine meant that without an active propellant consumption control, each boosters would deplete oxygen and fuel at different rates. This might result in as much as tens of tonnes of unburned propellant near the end of the burn. It would generate enormous strains on the structure and control authority due to the mass imbalance. Thus, the mixture ratio control system was developed to ensure the simultaneous consumption of propellant mass among the four R-7 boosters.

Production 
The RD-107 and RD-108 engines are produced at the JSC Kuznetsov plant in Samara, Russia, under the supervision of the Privolzhskiy branch of NPO Energomash, also known as the Volga branch. The Privolzhsky branch was organized as a branch of OKB-456 in 1958, specifically for the manufacture of RD-107 and RD-108 engines. The branch was led by Y.D. Solovjev until 1960, then by R.I. Zelenev until 1975, then by A.F. Udalov until 1978, and is currently led by A.A. Ganin.

Versions

RD-107 variants 
Modifications to the RD-107 design have led to production of several distinct versions of the engine:

 RD-107 (AKA  8D74): Original version. Used on the R-7, Sputnik, Vostok and Voskhod.
 RD-107K (AKA  8D74K): Improved version of the 8D74. Used on the Molniya (8К78).
 RD-107ММ (AKA  8D728 or 8D74M): Increased thrust over the 8D74K by 5%. Used on the Molniya-M (8К78М) and Soyuz (11A511).
 RD-117 (AKA  11D511): Improved structural changes. Used on the Soyuz-U (11А511U) and Soyuz-U2 (11A511U2).
 RD-107А (AKA  14D22): Improved version of the 11D511 with new injector design that eliminated the high frequency combustion instabilities. Used on the Soyuz-FG (11А511U-FG), Soyuz-STA (372RN21A) and Soyuz-STB (372RN21B).
 RD-107А (AKA  14D22KhZ): Chemical ignited version of the 14D22. Used on the Soyuz-2.1a (14A14-1A) and Soyuz-2.1b (14A14-1B).

RD-108 variants 
Similar modifications have led to several distinct versions of the RD-108:
 RD-108 (AKA  8D75): Original version. Used on the R-7, Sputnik, Vostok and Voskhod.
 RD-108K (AKA  8D75K): Improved version of the 8D74. Used on the Molniya (8К78).
 RD-108ММ (AKA  8D727 or 8D75M): Increased thrust over the 8D74K by 5%. Used on the Molniya-M (8К78М) and Soyuz (11A511).
 RD-118 (AKA  11D512): Improved structural changes. Used on the Soyuz-U (11А511U).
 RD-118PF (AKA  11D512PF): Version of the 11D5212 that run on Syntin rather than RG-1. It used selected injectors to minimize instabilities without changing constructions methods. But it required a significant number of engines produced to get injectors that complied with the stringent specifications. Used on the Soyuz-U2 (11A511U2).
 RD-108А (AKA  14D21): Improved version of the 11D511 with new injector design that eliminated the high frequency combustion instabilities. Used on the Soyuz-FG (11А511U-FG), Soyuz-STA (372RN21A) and Soyuz-STB (372RN21B).
 RD-108А (AKA  14D21KhZ): Chemical ignited version of the 14D22. Used on the Soyuz-2.1a (14A14-1A) and Soyuz-2.1b (14A14-1B).

Work on the 14D21 and 14D22 engines started in 1986, with a preliminary design completed in 1993. These engines incorporate a new injector head design to increase specific impulse. The first launch of a Progress cargo spacecraft using a launch vehicle equipped with these engines took place in May 2001. The first human spaceflight launch utilizing these engines took place in October 2002.

Hypergolic vs. pyrotechnic ignition 
Currently produced engines are ignited with a pyrotechnic ignition system. Energomash reports a new, hypergolic ignition system (on engines designated 14D21KhZ and 14D22KhZ) are ready for certification and flight tests.

References

External links 

 ЖРД РД-107 и РД-108 и их модификации
 РД-107/108 на сайте НПО Энергомаш

Rocket engines of Russia
Rocket engines of the Soviet Union
Rocket engines using kerosene propellant
Rocket engines using the gas-generator cycle
Energomash rocket engines